Bagmati Province (Bagmati Pradesh) is one of the seven provinces of Nepal established by the constitution of Nepal. The province is Nepal's second-most populous province and fifth largest province by area. Bagmati is bordered by Tibet Autonomous Region of China to the north, Gandaki Province to the west, Koshi Pradesh to the east, Madhesh Province and the Indian state of Bihar to the south. With Hetauda as its provincial headquarters, the province is also the home to the country's capital Kathmandu, is mostly hilly and mountainous, and hosts mountain peaks including Gaurishankar, Langtang, Jugal, and Ganesh.

Being the most populous province of Nepal, it possesses rich cultural diversity with resident communities and castes including Newar, Tamang, Madhesis, Sherpa, Tharu, Chepang, Jirel, Brahmin, Chhetri , Marwari and more. It hosted the highest number of voters in the last election for the House of Representatives and Provincial Assembly, which took place in 2017.

Etymology
Bagmati is named after the Bagmati River which runs through the Kathmandu valley. The river is considered the source of the Newar civilization and urbanization. The river has been mentioned as Vaggumuda in Vinaya Pitaka and Nandabagga. It has also been mentioned as Bahumati in Battha Suttanta of Majjhima Nikaya. An inscription dated 477 A.D. describes the river as Bagvati Parpradeshe and subsequently in the Gopalraj Vanshavali.

A provincial assembly meeting on 12 January 2020 endorsed the proposal to name the province as Bagmati by a majority vote.  Hetauda was declared as the permanent state capital on January 12, 2020.

Geography 

Bagmati Province has an area of 20,300 km2 which is about 13.79% of the total area of Nepal. The elevation of the province ranges from 141 m at Golaghat in  Chitwan District to 7,422m at Ganesh Himal. The province has an altitude low enough to support deciduous, coniferous, and alpine forests and woodlands. 27.29% land is covered by forest Temperature varies with altitude. There are 10 sub-basins and 33 major rivers flowing through the province. The longest river is Sunkoshi measuring 160.19 km.

Climate 
Bagmati province has climatic variations, which is associated with the diverse nature of its topography and altitude. Climatic zone of Bagmati province starts from High Himalaya in the north, above 5000 m with tundra and arctic climate to Siwalik region in the south, 500–1000 m with sub-tropical climatic zone. The annual precipitation also varies from 150 to 200 mm in the high Himalayas to 1100–3000 mm in the southern plains. Similarly, average annual temperature of the province varies from 30 °C to -10 °C. Rainfall takes place mainly during the summer.

History
During the Lichhavi and Malla period, this region was known as Nepalmandal and was ruled by Newar kings. Historically the area of Bagmati province known as "Kathmandu Kshetra", which was established in 1956. Kathmandu Kshetra was composed by grouping the then five districts. Those five districts are now divided into many districts.

The five districts were:
 Narayani District (Bara, Parsa, Rautahat)
 Rapti District (Chitwan, Ramechap, Makwanpur)
 Chautara District (Sindhupalchok, Kavrepalanchowk)
 Trishuli District (Nuwakot, Dhading)
 Kathmandu District (Kathmandu, Lalitpur, Bhaktapur)

In 1962, administrative system restructured and the "Kshetras" system cancelled and the country restructured into 75 development districts and those districts were grouped into zones. In 1972, the region was named to Central Development Region. It had 3 zones and 19 districts.

Major historical forts of Bagmati 

Makwanpurgadhi is located about 17 kilometers northeast of Hetauda, the district headquarters of Makwanpur district. Makwanpur Fort is a place of historical and tourist importance in Makwanpur district.

Sindhuli Gadhi is an important place in terms of natural beauty and history. This place is about 150 kilometers east of Kathmandu. Sindhuligadi Nepal is a living document of the British War.

Rasuwa Fort on the Nepal-China border is considered to be an important security fort between Nepal and China. The historical fortress is about a century and a half old.

Demographics 
According to the 2011 Nepal Census, Bagmati Province has a population of 5,433,818 comprising 2,761,224 females and 2,672,594 males. The province has the highest population in the country having 20.87% of the population. The population density of the province is 270 people per square kilometre which is the second highest in the country.

Ethnic groups 

Tamang is the largest ethnic group in the province making up around 20.54% of the population. Hill Brahmans are the next largest group making up around 18.32% if the population followed by Chhetris (17.13%) and Newars (17.07%) respectively. Similarly Magar, Kami and Gurung make up 4.87%, 2.52% and 2.22% of the population respectively. Tharu (1.63%), Rai (1.52%), Damai (1.36%), Sarki (1.33%) and Chepang (1.16%) are other smaller ethnic groups in the province.

Languages 

Nepali is the most common mother tongue in the province with 56.23% of the population speaking Nepali as their mother tongues. Tamang language is spoken by 18.16% and Nepal Bhasa is spoken by 12.23% of the population as their mother tongue. Magar (1.79%), Tharu (1.31%), Maithili (1.17%), Gurung (0.92%) and Chepang (0.83%) are other languages spoken in the province.

The Language Commission of Nepal has recommended Nepal Bhasa and Tamang as official language in the province. The commission has also recommended Magar, Tharu and Maithili to be additional official languages, for specific regions and purposes in the province.

Religion 

Hinduism is the most followed religion in the province, with 71.78% of the population identifying as Hindus. Buddhists are the largest minority population with 23.28% of the population following Buddhism and Christianity is followed by 2.87% of the population in the province.

Administrative subdivisions 

There are total 119 local administrative units in the province which include 3 metropolitan cities, 1 sub-metropolitan city, 41 urban municipalities and 74 rural municipalities.

Bagmati is divided into 13 districts, which are listed below. A district is administrated by the head of the District Coordination Committee and the District Administration Officer. The districts are further divided into municipalities or rural municipalities.

Districts 

Districts in Nepal are second level of administrative divisions after provinces. Bagmati Province is divided into 13 districts, which are listed below. A district is administrated by the head of the District Coordination Committee and the District Administration Officer. The districts are further divided to municipalities or rural municipalities.

Municipalities 
Cities and villages are governed by municipalities in Nepal. A district may have one or more municipalities. Bagmati has two types of municipalities.
 Urban Municipality (Urban Municipality has three levels):
 Metropolitan city (Mahanagarpalika)
 Sub-metropolitan city (Upa-mahanagarpalika) and
 Municipality (Nagarpalika)
 Rural Municipality (Gaunpalika)

The government of Nepal has set out a minimum criteria to meet city and towns. These criteria include a certain population, infrastructure and revenues.

Government and administration 

Bagmati provincial assembly is the unicameral legislative assembly consisting of 110 members. Candidates for each constituency are chosen by the political parties or stand as independents. Each constituency elects one member under the first past the post (FPTP) system of election. The current constitution specifies that sixty percent of the members should be elected from the first past the post system and forty percent through the party-list proportional representation (PR) system. Women should account for one-third of total members elected from each party. If one-third percentage are not elected, the party that fails to ensure so shall have to elect one-third of the total number as women through the party-list proportional representation. The Governor acts as the head of the province, while the Chief Minister is the head of the provincial government. The Chief Judge of the Patan High Court is the head of the judiciary.

The present Governor, Chief Minister and Chief Judge are Yadav Chandra Sharma, Rajendra Prasad Pandey and Tek Bahadur Moktan respectively. The provincial assembly has 110 members while the province has 33 House of Representative constituencies. The term length of provincial assembly is five years. The Provincial Assembly is currently housed at the Regional Education Directorate in Hetauda.

Economy
Bagmati Province is the most industrialized province and has maintained the leading position in the economic sector in Nepal. With GDP of NPR 1.43 Trillion (as of 2019), Bagmati alone is the single largest contributor to the national economy with a share of 37.7% in the country's GDP.

Major Business Groups 

 Ncell
 NTC
 Chaudhary Group
 Panchakanya Group

Infrastructure

Health Care 
According to the National Demographic Health Survey (NDHS) 2016, the Province's Neonatal Mortality (per 1000 live births) stands at 17 and Infant mortality rate (per 1000 live births) stands at 29, both of which are below the national average of 21 and 32,respectively.

According to the Annual report of Department of Health Services (DoHS) 2018/19, Bagmati Province has 35 public hospitals, 41 Primary Health Care Centres (PHCCs), 641 Health posts and 1417 Non-public facilities.

Education 
The province has always been an educational hub of the country.

Enrollment rate in primary school in the province is 95.79, whereas adult literacy stands at 74.85%.

There are various education levels in Bagmati Province. They are: Primary Level (31%), Lower Secondary Level (18%), Secondary Level (11%), SLC (12%), Intermediate Level (11%), Beginner (3%), Non-formal (5%), Graduate (6%), Postgraduate and above (2%).

Universities 

 Tribhuvan University
 Kathmandu University in Dhulikhel
 Nepal Open University in Lalitpur
 Agriculture and Forestry University in Rampur, Chitwan
 Madan Bhandari Academ of Health Sciences http://mbahs.edu.np/ in Hetauda

Communication 
In Bagmati province, 58.6% have radio access, followed by 54.0% have access to TV, and only 10.0% have access to the internet. Similarly, 16.7% have access to landline telephones, while 76.1% have access to mobile phones. There are a total of 51 radio stations. Some of the radio stations are Radio Chitwan, Radio Upathyaka, and Radio Lalitpur. There are a total of 405 newspaper channels in Bagmati Province with national, Provincial and local outreach. As per the classification, some of the top-ranking newspapers are Gorkhapatra Dainik, Himalayan Times.

Energy 
Bagmati Province has the second highest level of electrification with 94.44 percent electrification among the provinces. Districts like Kathmandu, Bhaktapur and Nuwakot are fully electrified. Sindhuli district has the lowest electrification rate with the coverage of 69.51% so far.

Transportation

Roadways 

Roads connect all 13 districts of Bagmati Province. However, people living in the high-altitude regions of Rasuwa, Sindhuplachok and Dolakha experience difficulty accessing roadways perennially. Major highways of the province are as follows:

 Tribhuvan Highway: Tribhuvan Highway (H02) which is also part of Asian Highway 42 (AH42) connects the capital city with Birgunj, a major business hub in Province 2 bordered with India.
 Araniko Highway: Araniko Highway (H03) which is also part of AH42 connects capital city with Kodari on the Nepal-China border.
 Prithivi Highway: Prithivi Highway (H04) connects capital city via Naubise, Dhading with Pokhara in Gandaki Province. This landslide-prone and heavily congested highway passes through five districts: Kathmandu, Dhading, Chitwan, Tanahuand Kaski.
 BP Koirala Highway: The BP Highway(H06), also known as the Banepa- Bardibas Highway, links Kathmandu Valley with Province 2 and connects with eastern Nepal.

Ropeways 

 Manakamana Cable Car (Bottom Station)
 Chandragiri Cable Car
 Kalinchowk Cable Car

See also

Provinces of Nepal
List of districts in Nepal

References

 
Provinces of Nepal
2015 establishments in Nepal
States and territories established in 2015